Houser-Conklin House is a historic home located in Monsey in Rockland County, New York. It was originally built c. 1775 as a -story, gable roofed sandstone dwelling, and subsequently raised to 2-stories with a frame addition dating to c. 1890–1900.  Attached to this main block is a -story kitchen wing and attached to that is a modern addition.

It was listed on the National Register of Historic Places in 2010.

References

Houses on the National Register of Historic Places in New York (state)
Houses completed in 1775
Houses in Rockland County, New York
Monsey, New York
National Register of Historic Places in Rockland County, New York